Baskó (Slovak: Baškov) is a village in Borsod-Abaúj-Zemplén county, Hungary.

History
Baski and the surrounding area has been inhabited since ancient times.  The year 1388 is the first time it was first mentioned when it was part of the estate of Boldogkoi castle.  The town's inhabitants lived by forestry.

In the fourteenth century, King Sigismund gave the Basko to the Czudar family.

External links 
  Street map

Basko